Carole Lombard (1908–1942) was an American cinema actress who appeared in 56 feature films and 18 short films in a career spanning 21 years before her death in an airplane crash at the age of 33.

Filmography

Silent Features

Sound Features

Short films

References

Lombard, Carole
Lombard, Carole